The Italian Catholic diocese of Bitonto, in Apulia, had a short independent existence from 1982 to 1986. In the latter year it was united into the Archdiocese of Bari, forming the Archdiocese of Bari-Bitonto. Before 1982, it had existed since the 9th century until being united into the diocese of Ruvo e Bitonto in 1818.

History

Bishop Anderano (from about 734) belonged either to Bitonto or the diocese of Bisignano; Arnolfo (1087) was the first uncontested Bishop of Bitonto. Other bishops include:

Enrico Minutolo (1382), later cardinal;
Cornelio Musso (1544), a Franciscan Conventual, participant at the Council of Trent;
Fabrizio Carafa (1622), founder of a literary academy;
Alessandro Crescenzi (cardinal) (1652), later cardinal.

Ordinaries

Diocese of Bitonto
Erected: 9th Century
Metropolitan: Archdiocese of Bari (-Canosa)
...
Enrico Minutoli (1382 - 1383 Appointed, Archbishop of Trani)
...
Battista Pontini (1484 - 1500 Died)
Giambattista Orsini (12 June 1501 - 20 Dec 1501), administrator
Giovanni Francesco de Orsini (20 Dec 1501 - 1517 Resigned)
Giulio de' Medici (18 Feb 1517 - 27 Feb 1517 Resigned)
Giacomo Orsini (27 Feb 1517 - 24 Jan 1530 Resigned)
Alessandro Farnese (seniore) (24 Jan 1530 - 17 May 1532 Resigned)
Lópe de Alarcón (17 May 1532 - 1537 Resigned)
Alessandro Farnese (iuniore) (17 Jun 1537 - 8 Jan 1538 Resigned)
Sebastiano Deli di Castel Durante (11 Jan 1538 - 1544 Died)
Alessandro Farnese (iuniore) (1544 - 27 Oct 1544 Resigned)
Cornelio Musso, O.F.M. Conv. (27 Oct 1544 - 13 Jan 1574 Died)
Giovanni Pietro Fortiguerra (26 Apr 1574 - 1593 Died)
Flaminio Parisio  (17 Sep 1593 - 1603 Died)
Girolamo Bernardino Pallantieri, O.F.M. Conv.  (10 Sep 1603 - 23 Aug 1619 Died)
Giovanni Battista Stella  (13 Nov 1619 - 15 Dec 1621 Died)
Fabrizio Carafa (bishop)  (24 Jan 1622 - Mar 1651 Died)
Alessandro Crescenzi (cardinal), C.R.S.  (26 Aug 1652 - 14 May 1668 Resigned)
Tommaso Acquaviva d'Aragona, O.P. (14 May 1668 - 23 Aug 1672 Died)
Francesco Antonio Gallo  (3 Oct 1672 - Sep 1685 Died)
Filippo Massarenghi, C.O. (13 May 1686 - 5 Jun 1688 Died)
Carlo de Ferrari  (6 Jun 1689 - Nov 1698 Died)
Giovanni Battista Capano, C.R.  (21 Jun 1700 - 14 Jan 1720 Died)
Domenico Maria Cedronio, O.P. (20 Mar 1720 - May 1722 Died)
Luca Antonio della Gatta  (6 Jul 1722 - 8 Jul 1737 Appointed, Bishop of Melfi e Rapolla)
Giovanni Barba  (8 Jul 1737 - 13 Dec 1749 Died)
Nicola Ferri  (23 Feb 1750 - 28 May 1770 Appointed, Bishop of Satriano e Campagna)
Orazio Berarducci  (28 May 1770 - 1801 Died)

27 June 1818: United with Diocese of Ruvo to form the Diocese of Ruvo e Bitonto

Diocese of Bitonto
30 September 1982: Re-established from the Diocese of Ruvo e Bitonto

Andrea Mariano Magrassi, O.S.B. (30 Sep 1982 - 30 Sep 1986 Appointed, Archbishop of Bari-Bitonto)

30 September 1986: United with Archdiocese of Bari (-Canosa) to form the Archdiocese of Bari-Bitonto

Auxiliary Bishops
Domenico Padovano (1984 to 30 Sep 1986)

Notes

References

Attribution

Bitonto
Diocese